Best Laid Plans is a 1999 American crime drama film directed by Mike Barker and written by Ted Griffin. The film stars Reese Witherspoon, Alessandro Nivola, and Josh Brolin.

Plot
Bryce is a successful man who returns to his tiny hometown for a visit. While there, he runs into his old friend Nick. The two decide to go out for the night. When they enter a bar, Bryce encounters Kathy, a blonde temptress whom he eventually takes home for the night. When he awakens, Kathy informs him that she is underage and threatens to tell the police that Bryce has committed statutory rape. Bryce panics and decides to tie her up and hide her away in the basement. He then makes a call to Nick. Unbeknownst to Bryce, Kathy is actually Nick's girlfriend Lissa. The two had schemed to use Bryce's money to pay off a $15,000 debt they owe small-time hood Jimmy.

Cast
 Reese Witherspoon as Lissa/Kathy
 Alessandro Nivola as Nick
 Josh Brolin as Bryce
 Terrence Howard as Jimmy
 Jamie Marsh as Barry
 Rocky Carroll as Bad Ass Dude
 Gene Wolande as Lawyer
 Owen Bush as Vagrant
 Sean Nepita as Freddie
 José Mendoza as Renaldo
 Michael G. Hagerty as Charlie
 David Mandel as Evangelist
 Alec Berg as Phone Guy No. 1
 Jeff Schaffer as Phone Guy No. 2

Reception
Best Laid Plans received mixed reviews.

Awards and nominations
California on Location Awards
1998: Won "Location Professional of the Year - Features" - Diane Friedman

References

External links
 
 
 

1999 films
1999 independent films
1999 crime films
1999 crime drama films
1999 drama films
1999 crime thriller films
1990s American films
1990s English-language films
1990s heist films
American crime drama films
American crime thriller films
American heist films
American neo-noir films
Films directed by Mike Barker
Films scored by Craig Armstrong (composer)
Films with screenplays by Ted Griffin
Fox Searchlight Pictures films